Gault et Millau  is a French restaurant guide. It was founded by two restaurant critics, Henri Gault and Christian Millau in 1965.

Points system
Gault Millau rates restaurants on a scale of 1 to 20, with 20 being the highest. Restaurants given below 10 points are rarely listed. The points are awarded based on the quality of the food, with comments about service, price or the atmosphere of the restaurant given separately. Based on this rating, high-ranking restaurants may display one to four toques.  Gault Millau does not accept payment for listing restaurants.

Under its original authors and for many years after they left, Gault Millau never awarded a score of 20 points, under the argument that perfection is beyond the limitations of a normal human being. In 2004, two restaurants, both of chef Marc Veyrat, the Maison de Marc Veyrat (or L'Auberge de l'Eridan) in Veyrier-du-Lac near Annecy and La Ferme de Mon Père ("My Father's Farm") in Megève, received this score. In 2010 and 2011, Sergio Herman's Oud Sluis also received a score of 20/20. To some, this reflects a fall of standards in the guide after it changed from employing a permanent editorial  and tasting staff to using local agents.

Differences with Michelin
There has been discussion about which guide is more important, the Michelin Guide or the Gault Millau. In the 1970s the Michelin's continued conservative support of traditional haute cuisine was challenged by the support of nouvelle cuisine by the Gault-Millau.  Michelin is more popular and therefore more influential, while Gault Millau has been considered more food-focused due to the main system being based purely on the quality of the food. Gault Millau has guides for various other countries, including Netherlands, Belgium & Luxembourg, Switzerland, Germany, and Poland.

French Chef of the Year
 1989 Joël Robuchon (Chef of the Century)
 1994 Roger Souvereyns
 2001 Luigi Ciciriello
 2002 Nicolas Le Bec
 2003 Michel Troisgros
 2004 Jean-Paul Abadie
 2005 Arnaud Magnier
 2006 Thierry Marx
 2007 Anne-Sophie Pic
 2008 Jean-Luc Rabanel
 2009 Léa Linster
 2010 William Ledeuil
 2011 Édouard Loubet
 2012 Michel Portos
 2013 Philippe Labbé
 2014 Arnaud Lallement
 2015 Yannick Alleno
 2016 Alexandre Gauthier
 2017 Alexandre Couillon
 2018 Jean Sulpice

See also
 Consumer Reports
 Harden's, a similar London and UK guide
 Michelin Guide
 Restaurant rating

References

External links
 The Gault Millau website for France
 The Gault Millau website for Belgium & Luxembourg
 The Gault Millau for Slovenia
 The Gault Millau for Italy
 The Gault Millau for Austria

Restaurant guides
1965 establishments in France